The BBC is forbidden under its charter to directly undertake any commercial operations on-air within the United Kingdom; however, no such restriction applies to operations in other countries. Therefore, the BBC exploits its massive television archive by operating a number of commercial television channels outside the UK through its BBC Studios subsidiary.

Some channels are wholly owned by BBC Studios, others are operated as joint ventures with other broadcasters.

Wholly owned channels
BBC Arabic Television – Arabic news channel available in the Arab World
BBC Brit – an entertainment channel. Available in Scandinavia, Poland and South Africa
BBC Earth – a documentary channel available in Scandinavia, Romania, Poland, Eastern Europe, Turkey, Asia, South Africa and South America.
BBC Entertainment – entertainment channel available in Europe (except Scandinavia and Eastern Europe), Turkey and Israel
BBC First – an entertainment channel focusing on comedy, crime and drama programming. Available in Asia, Australia (BBC First (Australia)), Benelux (BBC First (Dutch TV channel)), Central and Eastern Europe (Croatia,North Macedonia, Poland and Slovenia), Middle East & North Africa and South Africa.
BBC HD – high-definition television channel available in Turkey
BBC Knowledge – educational & information channel available in Australia and New Zealand (not related to the UK-only BBC Knowledge, which has been replaced)
BBC Lifestyle – available in Poland, South Africa and Asia
BBC Persian – Iranian/Afghan news channel available in Europe, Iran, Afghanistan and Tajikistan
BBC UKTV – entertainment channel available in Australia and New Zealand (formerly in a 20% joint venture with Foxtel (60%) and RTL (20%), but as of 1 July 2008 wholly owned)
BBC World News – an International news channel from BBC available worldwide. Available in the UK, Overnight via BBC News Channel
CBeebies – channel for children aged 6 or under. Available in Poland, South Africa, Asia, Australia and MENA (Middle East and North Africa). The domestic channel is also available in Belgium, Netherlands and Switzerland.

Other
The domestic BBC channels can't be re-distributed outside of the United Kingdom. However, these channels are widely available on cable and IPTV in Belgium, Netherlands, Republic of Ireland and Switzerland.
BBC Studios also operate the UKTV network in the United Kingdom and Ireland.

Defunct channels

BBC Food – Southern Africa/Scandinavia; has been rolled into BBC Lifestyle
BBC Japan – an entertainment channel available in Japan, ceased broadcasting in 2006, owing to the closure of its local distributor
BBC Prime – entertainment channel available in Africa, Asia & Europe; ceased operations on 11 November 2009, replaced by BBC Entertainment.

Joint ventures

United States

BBC America – entertainment channel available in US. Owned by BBC Studios (50.01%) and AMC Networks (49.99%).

Canada
In Canada, channels are required by the Canadian Radio-television and Telecommunications Commission (CRTC) to have a certain quota of original Canadian content. The following BBC channels are operated in conjunction with Corus Entertainment and Knowledge West Communications respectively, with BBC having a 20% stake in each channel.

BBC Canada – entertainment channel available in Canada
BBC Kids – children's channel available in Canada

History

BBC World Service Television (1991–1994)
BBC World News was formerly known as BBC World Service Television was officially launched by Actress of the Republic of Indonesia's Djenar Maesa Ayu on 15 November 1991 at 20:00 HKT from the Hong Kong International Airport (former Kai Tak International Airport) in Kowloon Bay located of Kowloon Peninsula with 100-original staff members. It showed news programming from BBC One HD and BBC Two HD in addition to BBC World Service News.

Its schedule consists of some locally made programs in Hong Kong as well as news programmes from STAR News, it signed an agreement with CNN International News it allowing its access to that channel's programming. It also relayed Seputar Indonesia news programme from Indonesian free-to-air terrestrial television channel's RCTI which is also available in Hong Kong.

STAR TV is the based in Hong Kong via based satellite operator, will buy 20 percent of the national network BBC World Service Television giving it a firmer foothold in Asia first most populous country at a time when the British international news television advertising market is booming. STAR TV pay television services are already available on satellite in Southeast Asia.

Following STAR TV acquisition by Rupert Murdoch an owner by News Corporation, STAR TV BBC World Service Television Asia was removed from the satellite beam that broadcast into Hong Kong on 1 March 1994.

In mid-1994, there was a commercial dispute between BBC World Service Television and STAR TV, where the proposed joint venture by the latter was inconclusive and News Corporation didn't pay for the support and services that BBC News provided after over 3 years. As a result, their license for using the name BBC Television would initially expire. At British Broadcasting Corporations request, the deadline was extended twice from 1 February and finally on 30 April 1994. Following that, Rupert Murdoch is asking for a compensation of about HK$102.5 trillion (US$250 million) from the said company. This situation is said to benefit new look and rebranded which may become the next service that completely replaces BBC News. The dispute also caused BBC World Service Television to lose its monopoly to broadcast the STAR News.

BBC World Service Television was removed on BBC Television (handover form BBC) ceased support toward News Corporation, consequently suspending STAR TV operations indefinitely reprivatised from the United Kingdom (Great Britain) and reorganised to split into 2-stations: it screened both English and Chinese movie premiere with split into 1-stations of led "STAR Movies" with both movie premiere satellite channels a subsidiary of STAR TV & member of News Corporation on 1 May 1994 at 00:00 HKT such:
 "Fox Movies Video on Demand (was formerly known as STAR Movies)" – is a 24-hours in daily of Hollywood (English) movie channel based in the Hong Kong was backed by 20th Century Fox is a major American film studios a member of the MPAA.
 "STAR Chinese Movies (was formerly known as STAR Movies)" – is a 24-hours in daily of Asian (Chinese) movie channel based in the Republic of China (Taiwan) were still copyrighted form Hong Kong with studio by STAR TV Filmed Entertainment, produced by Fortune STAR Entertainment & distributed by Media Asia Entertainment Group based in Kowloon Peninsula on 1993.

BBC World and BBC Prime
The BBC's international operations initially consisted of a single channel – BBC World Service Television. On Thursday, 26 January 1995 at 19:00 GMT this was split into two television stations:
 Launched Monday, 16 January 1995 at 19:00 GMT: 24-hour English free-to-air terrestrial international news channel named "BBC World" (now BBC World News).
 Launched Monday, 30 January 1995 at 19:00 GMT: 24-hour English subscription lifestyle, variety & entertainment channel named "BBC Prime" (now BBC Entertainment).

The organisation subsequently launched localised stations focused on a particular area, such as BBC Food (Scandinavia) and BBC America alongside BBC World and BBC Prime.

In October 2006, BBC Entertainment replaced BBC Prime in Asian markets, and went on to replace it in other territories during the period 2007–2009. Other channels that were rolled out internationally included BBC Knowledge and BBC Lifestyle, and an international version of CBeebies. The aim of the new launches was to simplify and diversify the BBC Worldwide offering in the digital age. These launches absorbed some channels, such as BBC Food (into BBC Lifestyle), though channels focused on a particular local market (such as BBC America or BBC Persian TV) continued.

BBC World News
On 21 April 2008, BBC World was renamed "BBC World News" and new graphics were produced by the Lambie-Nairn design agency, accompanied by reworked music from David Lowe as part of a £550,000 rebranding of the BBC's news output and visual identity.

On 15 November 2010, BBC Worldwide sold 50% of its interests in Animal Planet and Liv to Discovery Communications for $156 million.

Internet & TV & Film
BBC Television which includes BBC Red Button
BBC Radio
BBC iPlayer
BBC Online
 BBC Earth Films
BBC Films
BBC Orchestras and Singers
S4C

References

External links
 TV Channels from BBC Worldwide's 2005 annual report
 BBC Worldwide channels official site